A hingel is a type of dumpling found in North Caucasus that is similar to manti. The meat version of the dish is often associated with the Turkish province of Çorum but there is a potato stuffed variety said to hail from Erzurum in eastern Anatolia. The meat stuff variety resembles a larger than average Turkish manti, but unlike manti, the filling includes onion, garlic and parsley as well as ground meat. It is served with a sauce of melted butter and yogurt.

The potato stuffed version is also sometimes called Sivas mantisi, named for the Sivas Province. In some versions from Sivas, the hingel dough may be shaped triangularly and boiled plain without any filling. Like other versions, this version is also served with a yogurt and butter sauce.

See also
 Khinkali

References

Circassian cuisine
Dumplings